Tober may refer to:

Tober (surname), a surname
Tober, County Westmeath, a townland in County Westmeath, Ireland
Tober Weston (1888–?), English footballer

See also
Tober Colleen Formation, a geologic formation in Ireland